Harold Ferguson may refer to:

Harold S. Ferguson (1851–1921), Scottish zoologist who worked in India
Harold Ferguson High School, an alternative high school in Loveland, Colorado
Harold Ferguson, character in Executive Action (film)

See also
Harry Ferguson (1884–1960), Irish engineer and inventor